SS Theodore Foster was a Liberty ship built in the United States during World War II. She was named after Theodore Foster, an American lawyer and politician from Rhode Island. He was a member of the Federalist Party and later the National Republican Party. He served as one of the first two United States senators from Rhode Island and served as Dean of the United States Senate.

Construction
Theodore Foster was laid down on 31 March 1942, under a Maritime Commission (MARCOM) contract, MCE hull 43, by the Bethlehem-Fairfield Shipyard, Baltimore, Maryland; she was sponsored by Miss Barbara W. Vickery, the daughter of Vice Admiral Howard L. Vickery, and was launched on 14 June 1942.

History
Theodore Foster was allocated to Shepard Steamship Company, on 29 June 1942. On 9 August 1949, she was laid up in the Hudson River Reserve Fleet, Jones Point, New York. On 12 August 1953, she was withdrawn from the fleet to be loaded with grain under the "Grain Program 1953", she returned loaded on 24 August 1953. On 5 March 1956, Theodore Foster was withdrawn to be unload, she then returned empty 22 March 1956. On 24 July 1956, she was withdrawn from the fleet to be loaded with grain under the "Grain Program 1956", after which she returned loaded on 8 August 1956. On 17 June 1963, Theodore Foster was withdrawn to be unload, she returned empty 20 June 1963. She was sold for scrapping on 24 March 1970, to Hierros Ardes, SA., for $105,700. She was removed from the fleet, 26 June 1970.

References

Bibliography

 
 
 
 

 

Liberty ships
1942 ships
Ships built in Baltimore
Hudson River Reserve Fleet
Hudson River Reserve Fleet Grain Program